David Arthur Rogers  (12 March 1921 – 23 November 2020) was Archdeacon of Craven from 1977 to 1986.

Early life
Rogers was born in a South Yorkshire vicarage in 1921, the son and grandson of clergymen. He was educated at Aysgarth School in Bedale, and St Edward's School, Oxford.

Military
At the start of WWII Rogers joined the Oxford City Local Defence Volunteers, and then, in 1940, the Bedfordshire and Hertfordshire Regiment as a private soldier. In 1941 he was commissioned into the Green Howards Regiment, and later the Royal Armoured Corps. Later in the War, he served in the GHQ Liaison Regiment (Phantom) under Field Marshal Montgomery.

Career
He read Classics at Christ's College, Cambridge and trained for ordination at Ridley Hall, Cambridge. He was ordained deacon in 1949, and priest in 1950. He served his title at St George's, Stockport (1949-53) and was then Rector of St Peter's, Levenshulme (1953-59). He was then Vicar of St Andrew's, Sedbergh (1959-79), as well as Rural Dean of Sedbergh (1959-73) and Rural Dean of Ewecross (1973-77).  He was collated Archdeacon of Craven in 1977, and served in that office until his retirement in 1986. He chaired the Council of Parcevall Hall, a diocesan retreat and conference centre.

Personal life
Rogers died in 2020, aged 99. He was predeceased by his wife, Joan. There were four children of the marriage.

References

1921 births
Alumni of Christ's College, Cambridge
Alumni of Ridley Hall, Cambridge
Archdeacons of Craven
2020 deaths
British Home Guard soldiers
British Army personnel of World War II
Bedfordshire and Hertfordshire Regiment soldiers
Green Howards officers
Royal Armoured Corps officers
Military personnel from Yorkshire
People educated at Aysgarth School